Uzi fly or uji fly is a common name for several flies that parasitize silkworms and may refer to:

Blepharipa zebina
Crossocosmia sericariae
Ctenophorocera pavida
Exorista bombycis
Exorista sorbillans

Insect common names
Tachinidae
Sericulture